Vincent Clarico (born 8 January 1966 in Saint-Denis, France) is a French former hurdler who competed at the 1996 Summer Olympics.

Competition record

References

1966 births
Living people
French male hurdlers
Olympic athletes of France
Athletes (track and field) at the 1996 Summer Olympics
Mediterranean Games gold medalists for France
Mediterranean Games medalists in athletics
Athletes (track and field) at the 1993 Mediterranean Games
Athletes (track and field) at the 1997 Mediterranean Games
Athletes (track and field) at the 2001 Mediterranean Games